The women's 50 metre freestyle S4 event at the 2016 Paralympic Games took place on 16 September 2016, at the Olympic Aquatics Stadium. Two heats were held, with seven and eight swimmers respectively. The swimmers with the eight fastest times advanced to the final, which was won by Australia's Rachael Watson.

Records
Prior to the final, the World and Paralympic records were as follows:

S3

S4

Heats

Heat 1
10:28 17 September 2016:

Heat 2
10:32 17 September 2016:

Final
18:33 17 September 2016:

Notes

Swimming at the 2016 Summer Paralympics